Terrassa Cathedral, or the Cathedral Basilica of the Holy Spirit is a Roman Catholic church located at the plaça Vella of Terrassa. It is the seat of the Diocese of Terrassa.

See also
Catholic Church in Spain

References

External links 
official website of the Cathedral of Terrassa (Catalan)

Roman Catholic cathedrals in Catalonia